Simon Line (born 1 November 1971) is an English association football manager who was in charge of Hednesford Town and Market Drayton Town. As a player, he was on the books of Crystal Palace and Brentford, but played only one match at a professional level, a League Cup game for Brentford in 1991.

He managed Market Drayton Town until 2008, when he left to take the manager's job at Hednesford. He resigned from Hednesford on 14 January 2010 citing personal reasons. In February 2010 he returned to Market Drayton Town as manager but he was sacked in May 2011 by the club.

References

1971 births
Living people
Footballers from York
English footballers
Association football forwards
Brentford F.C. players
Crystal Palace F.C. players
English football managers
Hednesford Town F.C. managers
Market Drayton Town F.C. managers